The Class C (6.5 to 8 metres) was one of three motorboating classes contested on the Water motorsports at the 1908 Summer Olympics programme. Nations could enter up to 3 boats. In addition to the length minimum and maximum, the boats had to weight at least 800 kilograms (without fuel or crew), have "a total piston area not exceeding that represented by four cylinders each of 106 mm. bore," and "comply with the rules of the International Sporting Club of Monaco in regard to cruisers."

The first race of 29 August 1908 was the small class of boats. Gyrinus, which had won the B class the day before, appeared again. This time her competition was Sea Dog. Again, however, Gyrinus was the only boat to finish, as Sea Dog experienced engine problems and had to be towed off the course.

Results

References

Notes
 
 
 

Class C